Elektra, also spelt Electra, is a female given name. Its Greek origin ( Ἠλέκτρα, Ēlektra) means "amber", and thus "shining", "incandescent". Names with similar meanings are Lucy and Svetlana. Variants are Ilektra, Ela, Elka, Elke, Elek, Elektrine.

It is also a surname.

People with the given name
Electra, daughter of Agamemnon and Clytemnestra in Greek mythology
Electra (Pleiad), one of the Pleiades in Greek mythology
 Electra Waggoner Biggs (1912–2001)
 Electra Carlin (1912–2000)
 Electra Collins Doren (1861–1927), suffragette and library scientist
 Electra Elite, Serbian singer and sex worker
 Electra Mustaine (born 1998)
 Electra Waggoner (1882–1925)
 Electra Havemeyer Webb (1888–1960), American museum founder
Elektra, name used by Salina Bartunek, competitor on American Gladiators
Elektra, ring name of Donna Adamo (born 1970), American wrestler
 Elecktra Bionic, Italian drag queen
Ilektra Apostolou (1912-1944), Greek Resistance member
Ilektra Lebl (born 1999), Greek swimmer

People with the surname
 Carmen Electra (born 1972), American model
 Dorian Electra (born 1992), American singer
 Justine Electra, Australian musician based in Berlin

Fictional characters
 Electra au Barca, a character in the Iron Gold science fiction series
 Electra Heart, a character created by Welsh recording artist Marina Dimandis which her 2012 album, Electra Heart had songs that represented the character Electra Heart's life
Elektra King, character in the 1999 James Bond film The World is Not Enough
Elektra Natchios from Marvel Comics
Mandy "Elektra" Perkins, characters in the TV series Tracy Beaker Returns and The Dumping Ground
 Elektra Abundance, main character on the television show Pose

References

Feminine given names
Greek feminine given names
English feminine given names
Czech feminine given names